Vernon Brown may refer to:

Vernon Brown (musician) (1907–1979), American big band trombonist from Benny Goodman's orchestra
Vernon Brown (architect) (1905–1965), New Zealand architect and educator
Vernon Brown (murderer) (1953–2005), American murderer and suspected serial killer
Vernon Brown (rugby union referee), in 2013 Women's Six Nations Championship
Vernon J. Brown (1874–1964), 45th Lieutenant Governor of Michigan

See also
Verne Brown, Back to the Future character